The Palm Desert Coyotes are an independent professional baseball team that is based in Palm Springs, California as a part of the California Winter League. They play their games in a short-season schedule from January to February at Palm Springs Stadium and at the nearby Palm Springs High School baseball field, along with the Palm Springs Chill, Canada A's and Coachella Valley Snowbirds and several other teams. The Coyotes didn't play in 2012 due to a team suspension of operations. They were replaced by the winter league version of the Palm Springs Power. The Coyotes returned in 2013.

Year-by-year records

California Winter League:

External links
 California Winter League official website

Amateur baseball teams in California